Clonskeagh Bridge is a bridge over the River Dodder in Dublin, Ireland. The bridge is on the Clonskeagh Road and forms part of the administrative boundary between Dublin City Council and Dún Laoghaire-Rathdown County Council

References

External links
Picture of old bridge c. 1820s from the National Library of Ireland.

Bridges in Dublin (city)